DeArment may refer to:

Champion–DeArment Tool Company, shortened to Channellock, an American company that produces hand tools
Roderick Allen DeArment (born 1948), U.S. politician, nominated to be United States Deputy Secretary of Labor under President George H.W. Bush in 1989.